Lower Benefield is a village on the A427 road in North Northamptonshire, England, near Oundle. It is part of the civil parish of Benefield. The population is included in the Civil Parish of Weston and Weedon.

The villages name means 'Open land of Bera's people'.

St Mary's Church is a Grade II* listed building . It has Medieval origins but was largely rebuilt c.1847 by John Macduff Derick for the Watts-Russell family of Biggin Hall, and restored in 1897 and 1901.

References

External links 

Villages in Northamptonshire
North Northamptonshire